Hervé Itoua (born 1942) is the former bishop of the Roman Catholic Diocese of Ouesso.

Biography
Hervé Itoua was born in 1942 in Otambioko, Republic of the Congo. He was ordained a priest on July 12, 1970. On June 6, 1983 he was appointed the first bishop of Ouesso. He was consecrated bishop on August 28, 1983. On April 22, 2006 he resigned as bishop, and was succeeded by Yves Marie Monot.

References

1942 births
Living people
21st-century Roman Catholic bishops in the Republic of the Congo
Roman Catholic bishops of Ouesso
Republic of the Congo Roman Catholic bishops